Bosner Island is an Antarctic rocky island,  long, lying  northwest of Boffa Island and half a kilometre east of Browning Peninsula in the south part of the Windmill Islands. It was first mapped from air photos taken by USN Operation Highjump and Operation Windmill in 1947 and 1948. Named by the US-ACAN for Paul Bosner, member of one of the two Operation Windmill photographic units which obtained aerial and ground photos of the area in January 1948.

See also 
 Composite Antarctic Gazetteer
 List of Antarctic and sub-Antarctic islands
 List of Antarctic islands south of 60° S
 SCAR
 Territorial claims in Antarctica

References

External links 

Windmill Islands